Clafasio Dias is an Indian politician and former Member of the Goa Legislative Assembly. He represented the Cuncolim Assembly constituency. Dias won by defeating sitting MLA Subhash Rajan Naik of BJP and Ex Independent MLA Joaquim Alemao. He was also azilla panchayat member, Sarpanch and Chairperson of South Goa Zilla Panchayat.

He was one of the ten members of Indian National Congress who joined Bharatiya Janata Party in July 2019.

References

Living people
Former members of Indian National Congress from Goa
Goa MLAs 2017–2022
Year of birth missing (living people)
Bharatiya Janata Party politicians from Goa